The men's 5000 metres at the 2016 European Athletics Championships took place at the Olympic Stadium on 10 July.

Summary

This race had one of the closest finishes in championship distance racing.  Coming off the turn, Ethiopian born Azerbaijani Hayle Ibrahimov held the curb and lead position.  He held off all challenges to the position until reaching the final straightaway, when the crowd of trailers passed him.  Spaniard Adel Mechaal was pressuring in the more common outside shoulder position, so Ibrahimov came off the turn a little wide to force Mechaa to run extra distance, but that opened the door for Frenchman Mourad Amdouni to squeeze through on the inside.  Behind them German Richard Ringer went wider into lane 2, followed by Norwegian Henrik Ingebrigtsen on the outside of lane 2.  Trailing the group down the backstretch, Moroccan born Spaniard Ilias Fifa had just about made up the gap and was catching the back of the lead group as the sprinting began.  Ibrahimov was unable to keep up, overstriding Mechaal held the edge over Amdouni, but Ringer and Ingebrigtsen were closing fast on the outside, still trailed by Fifa.  Similar to Ibrahimov earlier, Ringer went wide to force Ingebrigtsen to run wider.  That opened up a gap for Fifa to squeeze by on the inside of Ringer, outside of his teammate Mechaal.  Fifa, Mechaal, Ringer, Ingebrigtsen and Amdouni hit the finish line as a wall, Amdouni clearly the loser but the other four having to be separated by photo finish.  It was ruled that the fast closing Fifa won, Mechaal second and Ringer third, all given the same time 13:40.85 accurate to a hundredth of a second.  Ingebrigtsen was the odd man out, given a time of 13:40.86.  Fifth place Amdouni was only .09 behind the winner.  As comparison at these championships, fifth place in the 100 metres was .12 behind the winner (though the first two places did receive the same time in that race too).

Records

Schedule

Results

Final

References

External links
 amsterdam2016.org, official championship site.

5000 M
5000 metres at the European Athletics Championships